Anatoli Alekseyevich Agrofenin (born 6 November 1980) is a Russian professional football coach and a former player.

Club career
He played in the Russian Football National League for FC Chita in 2009.

References

1980 births
Sportspeople from Vladivostok
Living people
Russian footballers
Association football defenders
FC Luch Vladivostok players
FC Zvezda Irkutsk players
FC Sakhalin Yuzhno-Sakhalinsk players
FC Baikal Irkutsk players
Russian football managers
FC Chita players
FC Amur Blagoveshchensk players